Alexandra Yakovlevna Ovchinnikova (sometimes translated as Aleksandra) (Russian: Александра Яковлевна Овчинникова) (1914–2009), a native Yakut, served as President of the Yakut Autonomous Soviet Socialist Republic. A daughter of illiterate cattle-breeders west of Yakutsk, she became a road engineer. She was named president of Yakutia, in 1963, and served until 1979. She was succeeded by Yevdokiya Nikolayevna Gorokhova. She died at age 95 in 2009.

References

1914 births
2009 deaths
People from the Sakha Republic
People from Yakutsk Oblast
Yakut people
Communist Party of the Soviet Union members
Recipients of the Order of Lenin
Soviet women in politics